Uliastai, also spelled Uliyasutai or Oulia-Sontai, and sometimes known as Javkhlant, is a city in Mongolia  located in the western part of the country and  from the capital Ulaanbaatar. Uliastai is the capital of Zavkhan Province and was the 10th most populous city in the country with a population of 24,276 (2000 census). However, recent estimates have the city's population at 16,240 (.) making it the 16th most populous city in Mongolia.

Uliastai is located in a river valley where the Chigestai and Bogdiin Gol rivers meet, and is surrounded by mountains on all sides. It is one of the most remote aimag capitals in Mongolia. Uliastai city has sum (district) status and forms an enclave within the surrounding Aldarkhaan sum.

History 
Alongside Khovd, Uliastai is one of the oldest settlements in Mongolia, and has long been an important center of caravan trade even into the 20th century. It was connected by camel caravan routes with Urga (now Ulaanbaatar) in the east, Khovd in the west, Barkol and other points in Xinjiang in the southwest, and Hohhot in the southeast.

The city was founded as a military garrison by the Manchus in 1733 during the Qing rule of Mongolia. Uliastai was the de facto capital of Outer Mongolia, as the Qing Amban, the Governor General, located its office in Uliastai to keep eye on the Khalkh Mongols to the east and the Oirad Mongols west of the Khangai mountains. At its peak, the fortress held up to 3500 soldiers and was surrounded by a Chinese trading quarter, or "Maimaicheng".

In March 1755, a Qing dynasty army departed from Uliastai as the vanguard in the Qianlong Emperor's final push against the Dzungar Khanate to the south west.

During the Outer Mongolian Revolution of 1911 the Military Governor of Uliastai, his staff, and military guards, fled the Uliastai fortress under the protection of Cossack troops. Traces of Manchu rule can still be seen in Uliastai: the stone remnants of the governors fortress near the Bogdiin river are a short walk from town, the shackles and torture devices used by the Manchu are on display in the History Museum, and a hatag-laden stone near the central roundabout is carved with Chinese characters.

Transportation 
The old Uliastai Airport has two unpaved runways and is close to the city, but no longer receives flights. In 2002, the Donoi Airport (or "New Uliastai Airport") was built 25 km west of the city near Aldarkhaan soum, and now serves Uliastai with regular flights to and from Ulaanbaatar.

Education
Uliastai is host to the Zavkhan branch of the National University of Mongolia. Originally established in 1974, it was granted the status of a full member of the NUM in 2010.

Features 
Museums
 Museum of Famous People – dedicated to former residents of Zavkhan aimag, the museum has artifacts from the lives of Mongolian prime ministers, presidents, generals and Buddhist saints (Хутагт).
 History Museum – Zavkhan's natural and cultural history museum.

Monasteries
 Togs Boyant Javklhant – located on a hilltop overlooking the Chigestai river, just north of the main street, this temple features a traditional Mongolian ger, several stupas and a large Bodhisattva statue.
Ochirpurev Tsogt – A small Nyingma temple on Main street near the museums.

Javkhlant Tolgoi
Next to Togs Boyant Javklhant temple, a hilltop pavilion surrounded by statues of elk, ibex, and argali sheep. It's a quick hike from the center of town, and offers a good panorama of the city.

Climate 
Uliastai experiences a cold semi-arid climate (Köppen: BSk) with long, dry, very cold winters and short, warm summers.

Sources

External links 

Manchu Dynasty Government Structure, 1691–1910  University of Pennsylvania Museum of Archaeology and Anthropology

Aimag centers
Districts of Zavkhan Province